Torstein Træen (born 16 July 1995) is a Norwegian racing cyclist, who currently rides for UCI ProTeam . He competed in the men's team time trial event at the 2017 UCI Road World Championships.

Major results
2017
 2nd Road race, National Under-23 Road Championships
 7th Skive–Løbet
2018
 2nd Overall International Tour of Rhodes
2019
1st  Active rider classification, Danmark Rundt
 1st  Mountains classification, Oberösterreichrundfahrt
2020
 2nd Lillehammer GP
 2nd Overall Tour of Małopolska
1st Stage 3
 5th Road race, National Road Championships
 7th Overall International Tour of Rhodes
1st  Mountains classification
 9th Overall Tour Colombia
2021
 5th Overall Tour Alsace
 5th Boucles de l'Aulne
 9th Overall Tour of Norway
 10th Overall Arctic Race of Norway
2022
 1st  Mountains classification, Tour of the Alps
 3rd Overall Tour de Langkawi
 7th Overall CRO Race
 9th Overall Volta a Catalunya
2023
 10th Overall Tour des Alpes-Maritimes et du Var

References

External links
 

1995 births
Living people
Norwegian male cyclists
People from Ringerike (municipality)
Sportspeople from Viken (county)